Sanity and Grace is the third live album by American singer Judy Collins, released in February 1989 by Gold Castle Records.

Overview
The album was recorded live on 10 June 1988 in Tarrytown, New York. Like its predecessors, the album is unique in that it features previously unsung songs by Collins. It is also the first full length album since 1985. The album features four Collins original songs, as well as several cover versions, including "From a Distance" and "Wind Beneath My Wings", which would go on to become big hits for Bette Midler.

Track listing

References

External links
 

1989 live albums
Judy Collins live albums